Ilusión (plural: ilusiones) may refer to:

Ilusiones, Venezuelan telenovela 1995
Ilusiones (es), Argentina telenovela 2000 Oscar Martínez (actor)
Ilusión (Edurne album), 2007
Ilusión (Fonseca album), 2011
Ilusión World Tour
"Ilusión", Julieta Venegas MTV Unplugged (Julieta Venegas album)

See also
Ilusión Nacional
Dulce Ilusión
Calle Ilusión
Pampa Ilusión